Khalil Amine (born 1962) is a materials scientist at Argonne National Laboratory and is an Argonne distinguished fellow and group leader of the Battery Technology group. His research team is focused  on the development of advanced battery systems for transportation applications. In addition to his Argonne appointment, he is an adjunct professor at Stanford University, Imam Abdulrahman Bin Faisal University, Hong Kong University of Science & Technology, King Abdulaziz University, Hanyang University, and Peking University.

For his contributions in the field of electrochemical materials development, Amine was awarded the Global Energy Prize in 2019, and Scientific American's Top Worldwide 50 Research Leader Award in 2003.  In 2017, Amine was chosen as a Fellow  of the Electrochemical Society. He is the founder and chairman of the Advanced Lithium Battery for Automotive Application (ABAA) global conference.

Early career and education
Amine received his  a Ph.D. in materials science in 1989  from the University of Bordeaux in France. After completing his doctorate, Amine did postdoctoral studies at Katholieke Universiteit Leuven in Belgium. Moving to Japan in the early 1990s, Amine held various positions at Japan Storage Battery Company, the Osaka National Research Institute, and Kyoto University, before moving to Argonne National Laboratory in 1998.

Research

Lithium-Ion battery cathode materials 
 
● Cathode materials based on the AB2O4 spinel structure have been studied extensively since the mid-1980s due to their stability, kinetics, and large number of material that crystallize with this stoichiometry.  In 1996, Amine and co-workers reported the synthesis and electrochemistry of the ordered spinel  LiNi0.5Mn1.5O4 (1996), a cathode often called '5V spinel".  Its notable for its stable high voltage with a typical capacity of 125 mAh/g. The compound operates using only the nickel content as the active redox species while the structure inhibits charge compensation by oxygen evolution. 

● One of the most commercially successful lithium-ion cathode materials are the NMC cathodes (patent issued 2005), based on a nano-domain structure of two closely related layered oxides.  They are widely used cathode materials in consumer electronics and electric vehicles.  NMC technology has been incorporated into multiple batteries types around the world including those that powered GM's Chevy Volt and Bolt. Depending on the lithium content, these materials show an activation step on the first charging cycle that creates a heterogeneous electrochemically active material with capacities greater than 220 mAh/g.

● One of the instabilities of NMC cathodes involves the redox activity of the highly charged cations at the surface against the solvent molecules of the organic electrolyte. In 2012 Amine and Prof Yang Kook Sun from Hanyang University,   reported an improvement over the standard NMC cathode by devising a synthetic strategy that slightly orders the constituent cations to create a gradient structure that allows for the surface to be less reactive than the bulk. An advanced version of the NMC cathode technology allows for a wide range of formulations and compositions to be created across each particle to increase both energy and stability at high voltage.

● Lithium-air technology, including a new series of catalysts (2007) developed with Larry Curtiss of Argonne National Laboratory for Lithium-air energy storage systems that increase reversibility, was developed to reduce the overpotential observed in air-based systems associated with the needed electron transfer reactions.   In 2013 they improved on the system by developing a closed oxygen system that results in a significant simplification of the purification and storage system. The system stores energy in the couple going from superoxide (O2−) anion to the peroxide (O2−2) anion. The net reaction is (LiO2 +Li –-> Li2O2).

Honors and awards
	Global Energy Prize, 2019
	Electrochemical Society Battery Research Award, 2019
	International coalition for energy storage and innovation award, 2019
	Elsevier Energy Storage Material Journal Award, Shenzhen, October 2018
	Named Highly-Cited Researcher in 2017, 2018 and 2019 by Clarivate Analytics
	Named one of most cited authors in energy storage between 1998 and 2008 by ScienceWatch
	NAATBatt Lifetime Achievement Award, 2017
	US Department of Energy Outstanding Scientist Award, 2013
	International Battery Association Award (2010)
	Electrochemical Society Battery Technology Award, 2010
	US Federal Laboratory Award for Excellence in Technology Transfer (2009)
	University of Chicago's Board of Governors’ Distinguished Performance Award, 2008
	Scientific American Top Worldwide 50 Research Leader Award, 2003

Memberships and service
	Served in the board of the Committee on fuel economy of light duty vehicles of the National Academy of Sciences’ National Research Council
	Fellow of the Electrochemical Society, 2017 
	Fellow of the Hong Kong Hong Kong Institute of Advanced Studies
	Member of the American Ceramic Society
	Member of the Material Research Society
	Member of the American Chemical Society
	Chair of the International Meeting on Lithium Batteries 
	Associate Editor of Nano Energy Journal  
	Founded the International Conference on Advanced Lithium Batteries for Automotive Applications (ABAA) and chaired the conference from 2009 through 2012
	President of IMLB association

Selected patents
 US patent US6420069B2, positive electrode for lithium battery
 US patent US7468223B2, lithium metal oxide electrodes for lithium cells and batteries 
 US8591774B2, Methods for preparing materials for lithium ion batteries
 US patent US9593413B2, Composite materials for battery applications

References 

1962 births
Living people
20th-century American inventors
21st-century American inventors
American materials scientists
Argonne National Laboratory people
Moroccan chemists
Moroccan emigrants to the United States
Moroccan scientists